Delianuova is a comune (municipality) in the Province of Reggio Calabria in the Italian region Calabria, located about  southwest of Catanzaro and about  northeast of Reggio Calabria. Delianuova borders the following municipalities: Cosoleto, San Luca, Scido.

Environment  
The town is located in the Aspromonte National Park at an altitude ranging between 600 and 800 meters above sea level. It is an area of outstanding natural beauty.  The town is surrounded by centuries old olive groves. The territory is also rich in  holm oaks, chestnut trees and beech trees,  silver firs and atmospheric black pine forests.

History 
Delianuova was founded on January 27, 1878 by an order of King Umberto I to amalgamate the two neighboring municipalities of Paracorio and Pedavoli.  Tradition has it that Paracorio descended from the ancient Delia, a Greek city in southern Ionian coast, destroyed by the Saracens in the ninth century. Paracorio was known as Perachorio (Περαχώριον), which in Greek means "the land beyond the mountains"; Pedavoli was known in antiquity as Dapidalbon (Δαρίδαλβον) probably Tyrrhenian origin.

Mafia 
Over the years, Delianuova has been repeatedly connected with the 'Ndrangheta, both within Italy and abroad. Prominent international examples include the Musitano crime family and Johnny Papalia both from Hamilton, Ontario in Canada, and several prominent underworld figures from Melbourne, Australia. In 2008, Angelo Macrì murdered rival crime figure Rocco Frisina in a central street of Delianuova. Though the murder would have been seen by many people, all denied witnessing the event.

Demographic evolution

References

External links
 www.comune.delianuova.rc.it/
 Genealogical Information
 Lodging in Delianuova 
 History of Delianuova (Italiano) 
 Old Calabria By Norman Douglas

Cities and towns in Calabria